The 2020–21 Macedonian First League is the 29th season of the Macedonian First League, with 12 teams participating in it. The season began in October 2020.

Competition format 
Twelve teams that compose the league will play a double-legged round robin tournament. The top six teams supposed to compete in the Superleague. The teams that finish from 7th to 12th position on the table, supposed to play in the "Play-out" league and the last four teams at the end of season would be relegated. 

However, the competition  format was changed in midseason. Instead of playing the Superleague, the first eight teams at the end of regular season will compete in the Playoff tournament and the last four teams will compete in Playoff tournament where two defeated teams will be relegated.

Teams  

TFT Skopje and Crn Drim were promoted, while no team was relegated.

Regular season

League table

Playoff

Playout

|}

References

External links 

 Macedonian First League website
 Macedonian First League at Eurobasket.com

Macedonian First League (basketball) seasons
Macedonian
Basketball